Cellulomonas aerilata is a Gram-positive, aerobic and motile bacterium from the genus Cellulomonas which has been isolated from air from Suwon in Korea.

References

 

Micrococcales
Bacteria described in 2008